Jude Adjei-Barimah (born July 21, 1992) is an Italian-American football cornerback who is currently a free agent. He played college football at Bowling Green.

Early life 
Adjei-Barimah was born in Pordenone, Italy to Samuel Adjei and Agartha Boateng, before moving to Columbus, Ohio at the age of 9. Growing up in Italy, Adjei-Barimah played soccer.

Professional career
Adjei-Barimah signed with the Tampa Bay Buccaneers on July 29, 2015.

Adjei-Barimah was suspended for four games on November 22, 2016 for violating the league's policy on performance-enhancing substances.

On February 27, 2017, Adjei-Barimah signed a one-year contract tender with the Buccaneers. He was waived/injured by the Buccaneers on August 22, 2017 after suffering a patellar fracture and was placed on injured reserve.

In 2019, Adjei-Barimah joined the San Diego Fleet of the Alliance of American Football. After suffering an injury in the 2019 AAF season opener against the San Antonio Commanders, he missed the next three games before being placed on injured reserve on March 4. The league ceased operations in April 2019.

On October 16, 2019, Adjei-Barimah was drafted in the 4th round during phase four in the 2020 XFL Draft by the Tampa Bay Vipers.

References

External links
Tampa Bay Buccaneers bio

1992 births
Living people
American football cornerbacks
Bowling Green Falcons football players
Italian people of Ghanaian descent
Italian players of American football
Italian sportspeople of African descent
People from Pordenone
Players of American football from Columbus, Ohio
San Diego Fleet players
Sportspeople from Friuli-Venezia Giulia
Tampa Bay Buccaneers players